"Mind and Heart" is a song by Brazilian singer Lu Andrade. The track was released as the first official single from his solo career.

Background
The song was composed by singer in partnership with Bruna Caram, "I showed this song to my producer at the time, Alexandre Fontanetti, and he asked me if I wanted to show a singer who he had recently produced and who was very talented, Bruna Caram, she sent me a recording on the piano with a beautiful part that perfectly completes the idea, I hope it's our first partnership with many," said Luciana. The track was produced and mixed by Renato Patriarca in 2012.

Music video
Edited and directed by João Parisi, the music video was recorded at the Oxford studio in April 2013 and at studio midas in November 2012. The music video was released on the singer's official YouTube channel on May 16, 2013.

Relanse and performances
On December 24, 2012, Luciana released her first official single, "Mind and Heart", which received promotion in several television programs, including Todo Seu, Leão Lobo Visita and Jornal da Record News, besides the Brasil Ideal and Tá Ligado, of broadcasters in the interior of São Paulo.

References

2012 singles
2012 songs
Lu Andrade songs